Haoreima or Haoleima (literally, "tribal lady") is a goddess of tragic love and separation in Meitei mythology and religion of Ancient Kangleipak (Ancient Manipur). According to some legends, she was a woman from the hills, who was killed while arranging to meet her lover, and turned into a tortured spirit. She is regarded as an incarnation of Goddess Panthoibi. She is also identified with goddess Nongthang Leima. 
She is also worshipped as goddess Ireima. She is one of the most revered Meitei goddesses, though she is of Tangkhul origin.

Etymology 

In Meitei language (Manipuri language), the name "Haoreima" is derived from "Haoleima". "Haoleima" is made up of two component words, "Hao" and "Leima". In Meitei language (Manipuri language), "Hao" has multiple meanings. It may mean (1) yes (the response), (2) tasty, savoury or (3) tribe. Here, "Hao" means a "tribe". In Meitei language (Manipuri language), "Leima" means a queen or a mistress or a lady. 
The name "Haoreima" usually refers to a tribal woman carrying a traditional elongated basket ("sam" or "sham").

Legend of deification 
According to a legend, she was the daughter of Khelemba, a Tangkhul chief of Chingdai village. She was already married to "Khamlangba", a Tangkhul chief of Chingshong village. However, despite getting married to Khamlangba, she had a secret love affair with Meitei king Meidingu Tabungba, also known as Tabung Saphaba (1359-1394). Upon discovering the secret relationship, Khamlangba, getting angry, beheaded Tabung Saphaba. Traumatized at the event, Haoreima took away the head of her lover to the Kanglei Pungmayol. Later, she also followed her lover's path and turned into Meitei goddess of tragic love and separation.
She is also identified as goddess Ireima, who's also an incarnation of goddess Panthoibi.

Namesakes 
There are many people with the name "Haoreima" in the history of Ancient Kangleipak (Ancient Manipur).
Haoreima Tamheibee was the daughter of King Atom Nongyai Thingkol Hanba of the Khuman dynasty. She was married to Meitei King Kainou Irengba (984 AD-1074 AD). After the marriage, she came to be known as "Meitei Leima" (lit. Meitei Queen).

See also 
 Panthoibi
 Nongthang Leima

Notes

References

External links 

 

Abundance deities
Abundance goddesses
Beauty deities
Beauty goddesses
Crafts deities
Crafts goddesses
Death deities
Death goddesses
Domestic and hearth deities
Domestic and hearth goddesses
Fertility deities
Fertility goddesses
Fortune deities
Fortune goddesses
Health deities
Health goddesses
Leima
Life-death-rebirth deities
Life-death-rebirth goddesses
Love and lust deities
Love and lust goddesses
Magic deities
Magic goddesses
Maintenance deities
Maintenance goddesses
Medicine deities
Medicine goddesses
Meitei deities
Mountain deities
Mountain goddesses
Names of God in Sanamahism
Nature deities
Nature goddesses
Peace deities
Peace goddesses
Time and fate deities
Time and fate goddesses